Tipos del País, literally meaning Types of the Country, is a style of watercolor painting that shows the different types of inhabitants in the Philippines in their different native costumes that show their social status and occupation during colonial times.

History 

During the 19th century, secular subject matter in painting the Philippines increased extensively. With more tourists, ilustrados and foreigners demanding souvenirs and decorations from the country, Tipos del País developed in painting. Damián Domingo was the most popular artist who worked in this style.

Gallery

See also 

 Damian Domingo
 Justiniano Asuncion
 José Honorato Lozano
 Letras y figuras
Códice Casanatense

References 

Philippine art
Watercolor painting
Philippine handicrafts